Munkeby Abbey was a Cistercian monastery near the village of Okkenhaug in the municipality of Levanger in Trøndelag county, Norway. The name "Munkeby" in Norwegian means Place of the Monks. It was closed during the Protestant Reformation. Today the former abbey is the sight of medieval ruins  which are managed by the Society for the Preservation of Ancient Norwegian Monuments.

History
The abbey was founded sometime between 1150 and 1180, and was the most northerly Cistercian foundation in the world. Possibly, like Hovedøya Abbey and Lyse Abbey, Munkeby's foundation was carried out by English monks. In 1207, Tautra Abbey was founded, and, either then or at some later point in the 13th century that the community and assets of Munkeby were transferred to the new foundation, of which Munkeby then became a grange.

An attempt to re-establish it as an independent house in the 1470s failed. The church however continued in use as a parish church until 1587.
It has sometimes been asserted that the church here was the same as that dedicated to the local Saint Brettiva in Skogn, but this has not found general acceptance.

Local tradition had always maintained that Okkenhaug Chapel had once belonged to a monastery; for centuries historians dismissed this, until in 1906 a letter dated 1475 from Pope Sixtus IV to Abbot Stephen of Trugge was discovered in the Vatican archives referring to the request for the restoration of the site as a functioning monastery.

Norway accepted the Protestant Reformation and officially became a Lutheran kingdom in 1537. All Roman Catholic religious houses were then seized and declared to be Crown property as was true of Munkeby.

Site
There are substantial remains of the simple church, built of stone, although it was used as a quarry, but the monastic buildings, built of wood, apparently succumbed to fire in 1567. The site was acquired by the Society for the Preservation of Ancient Norwegian Monuments (Fortidsminneforeningen) in 1967. No full archaeological investigation of the site has been carried out, but many partial excavations have taken place, including test excavations in 2000, none of which able to discover significant remains of the monastic buildings, although there is no doubt that they were located on the south side of the church.

Munkeby Mariakloster
In 2007, the now-Trappist Abbey of Cîteaux in France decided to establish a new Cistercian monastery at Munkeby, the first new foundation directly from the very first house of the Order in 500 years. A monastery was built and four monks took residence there in 2009. They now form a companion community to the Trappistine nuns who have re-settled the site of the former Tautra Abbey. The name of the modern house is simply Munkeby Mariakloster.

See also
 Tautra Abbey
 Cistercians
 Trappists
 Citeaux Abbey

References

Sources

External links
 Katolsk.no: Munkeby 
 Fortidsminneforeningen: Munkeby 
 Homepage of the new Munkeby Cistercian Monastery

Levanger
Trappist monasteries
Cistercian monasteries in Norway
12th-century establishments in Norway
Christian monasteries established in the 12th century
1537 disestablishments in Norway
Monasteries dissolved under the Norwegian Reformation
Buildings and structures owned by the Society for the Preservation of Ancient Norwegian Monuments
21st-century Christian monasteries
2009 establishments in Norway